John Sherman (born 1959), nicknamed Verm (short for "Vermin") is an American climber and a pioneering boulderer. He is also a writer and photographer.  He is the originator of the V-scale for grading boulder problems.

Sherman was a very visible "outsider" character in the climbing world during much of the 1980s and 1990s. An early boulderer, Sherman followed the sport from the era of searching for elusive Gill arrows to the forefront of the modern climbing world.  He was one of the foremost developers of Hueco Tanks bouldering with over 400 first ascents there in the 1980s and early 1990s.

References 
 
 

American rock climbers
Living people
1959 births